Erik Jensen (2 March 1932 – 7 February 1992) was a Danish footballer. He played in four matches for the Denmark national football team from 1955 to 1957.

References

External links
 

1932 births
1992 deaths
Danish men's footballers
Denmark international footballers
Place of birth missing
Association footballers not categorized by position